Sadiqa Sahibdad Khan is a Pakistani politician who had been a member of the Provincial Assembly of the Punjab from August 2018 till January 2023.

Early life and education
She was born on 7 April 1935 in Amritsar, British India.

She has received matriculation level education.

Political career

She was elected to the Provincial Assembly of the Punjab as a candidate of Pakistan Tehreek-e-Insaf (PTI) on a reserved seat for women in 2018 Pakistani general election.

References

Living people
Punjabi people
Pakistan Tehreek-e-Insaf MPAs (Punjab)
1935 births